Misuzu (written: ,  or ) is a feminine Japanese given name. Notable people with the name include:

, better known as Emi Kuroda, Japanese actress 
, Japanese poet and songwriter
, Japanese golfer
, better known as Amii Ozaki, Japanese singer-songwriter
, Japanese actress, voice actress and singer

Fictional characters
, a character in the visual novel Air
, a character in the visual novel 11eyes: Tsumi to Batsu to Aganai no Shōjo
, a character in the light novel series A Certain Magical Index
, protagonist of the manga series Fragtime
, a character in the manga series ēlDLIVE

See also
3111 Misuzu, a main-belt asteroid

Japanese feminine given names